Qillqata (Aymara qillqaña to write, -ta a suffix, "written" or "something written", also spelled Khelkhata) is a  mountain in the Bolivian Andes. It is located in the Chuquisaca Department, Nor Cinti Province, San Lucas Municipality, near the border to the Potosí Department, José María Linares Province, Puna Municipality. It lies southeast of Otavi (Utawi).

References 

Mountains of Chuquisaca Department